A bread sauce is a British and Irish warm or cold sauce made with milk, which is thickened with bread crumbs, typically eaten with roast chicken or turkey.

Recipe
The basic recipe calls for milk and onion with breadcrumbs and butter added as thickeners, seasoned with nutmeg, clove, bay leaf, black pepper and salt, with the meat fat from roasting often added too. The use of slightly stale bread is optimal.

History
A survivor of the medieval bread-thickened sauces, it typically accompanies domestic fowl such as turkey or chicken.
Bread sauce can be traced back to at least as early as the medieval period, when cooks used bread as a thickening agent for sauces. The utilisation of bread in this way probably comes from cooks wanting to use up their stale bread who discovered that it could be incorporated within sauces to make them thicker.

See also

 List of bread dishes
 List of sauces

References

Breads
Sauces
Christmas food